Vishnevsky (masculine), Vishnevskaya (feminine), or Vishnevskoye (neuter) is the name of two rural localities in Russia:
Vishnevsky, Oryol Oblast, a settlement in Bolkhovsky District of Oryol Oblast
Vishnevsky, Bryansk Oblast, a settlement in Starodubsky District of Bryansk Oblast; abolished in 2010

References